Richard Flood (born 29 July 1982) is an Irish actor best known for the character Tommy McConnel in the series Crossing Lines, James McKay in the series Red Rock, Ford in the series Shameless, and starred as Dr. Cormac Hayes on Grey's Anatomy from 2019 to 2022.

Career 

Richard Flood portrayed the role of Samuel Johanson in an episode of the series Titanic: Blood and Steel in 2012. He joined the main cast of the new series Crossing Lines in 2013, playing detective Tommy McConnel, a specialist in weapons and tactics from Northern Ireland, until 2014. That next year, in 2015, Flood joined the main cast of the new series Red Rock, where he played the police superintendent James McKay, In 2017, it was announced that Flood would be cast as Ford in the Showtime series Shameless. He became a series regular ahead of the series’ ninth season. In 2019, Flood was cast in a recurring role as Dr. Cormac Hayes on ABC's Grey's Anatomy. He was promoted to star for the 2020-21 season.

Personal life 
In 2012, Flood began dating Italian actress Gabriella Pession, and the two became engaged in 2014. Shortly after, they announced that they were expecting their first child, Giulio Flood, born that same year.  On September 3, 2016, Flood married Pession in an intimate wedding in Italy.

Filmography

Film

Television

References

External links 
 
 Actor | Richard Flood
 Digital Spy > Celebrity News > Richard Flood

1982 births
Living people
Irish male television actors
Male actors from Dublin (city)